is a Japanese actor, director, fight choreographer,  stuntman and martial artist. He is best known for his role in Ryuhei Kitamura's cult film, Versus. Since his debut, Sakaguchi has worked with Kitamura several times, often appearing alongside fellow Kitamura staple Hideo Sakaki. He has also worked with frequent Kitamura collaborators Yudai Yamaguchi and Yuji Shimomura. Sakaguchi is a talented martial artist, and most often appears in films featuring copious fight scenes, usually performing all of his own stunts. He is purportedly skilled in Bajiquan, Shorinji Kempo, Boxing, Kickboxing, and while recently filming Re:Born learned the tactical martial art Zero Range Combat developed by Yoshitaka Inagawa.

Biography 
Before entering into the film industry, Sakaguchi was an underground street fighter who was well known for his skill in the martial arts. He was discovered by then-unknown director Ryuhei Kitamura, who recruited Sakaguchi for a lead role in Versus.  Since then, Sakaguchi has appeared in several films directed by Kitamura, including the Azumi films, Kitamura's short in the Jam Films titled The Messenger, and minor roles in Aragami and Alive. He played a larger role in the quirky, yet successful Battlefield Baseball (produced by Kitamura and directed by Yudai Yamaguchi).

2006 saw Sakaguchi in more mainstream roles, such as Yashamaru in Shinobi: Heart Under Blade, and "Grave" in Death Trance. He also guest-starred in the Japanese tokusatsu show, Kamen Rider Kabuto, as the villain Reiji Nogi/Cassisworm. In 2008, Sakaguchi made his directorial debut with Sakigake!! Otokojuku (a.k.a. "Samurai School"), in which he also starred, wrote the screenplay, and choreographed the action sequences. He made a cameo appearance in Yoshihiro Nishimura's 2008 exploitation film, Tokyo Gore Police, as well as directed/starred in Yoroi: Samurai Zombie, based on a story by Ryuhei Kitamura.

In 2011, Sakaguchi reprised his role as Yakyû Jubei in Deadball, a reimagining of Battlefield Baseball, and also co-directed/starred in Yakuza Weapon, based on the manga Gokudō Heiki. In 2013, Sakaguchi announced his retirement from acting to focus on work behind the camera. Despite this, he is expected to reprise his role as KSC2-303 in Ryuhei Kitamura's Versus 2, and has stated that he is currently working on a sequel to Death Trance.

Filmography

Actor 
Versus (2000) – Prisoner KSC2-303
Alive (2002) – Zeros
Battlefield Baseball (2003) – Yakyū Jubei
The Messenger (2003, Jam Films segment) – Man
Aragami (2003) – Future Challenger
Azumi (2003) – Sanzo Sajiki
Godzilla: Final Wars (2004 – X-Seijin)
Azumi 2: Death or Love (2005) – Tsuchigumo
Shinobi: Heart Under Blade (2005) – Yashamaru
Cromartie High - The Movie (2005) – Ichiro Yamamoto
Death Trance (2006) Grave
Yo-Yo Girl Cop (2006) – Enola Gay gang member
The Red Army (2007, directed by Kōji Wakamatsu) – Takaya Shiomi
Sakigake!! Otokojuku (2008) – Momotaro Tsurugi
Tokyo Gore Police (2008) – (cameo)
Elite Yankee Saburo The Movie (2009) – Hammerhead Boss
Mutant Girls Squad (2010) – Kisaragi
Deadball (2011) – Yakyû Jubei
Yakuza Weapon (2011) - Shozo
Men's egg Drummers (2011)
Snot rocket (2012) - Sankichi Tabana
Why Don't You Play in Hell? (2013) – Sasaki
Snake of Violence (2013) – Kenji
Max the Movie (2016) - Sakaguchi
Re:Born (2017) - Toshiro Kuroda
Red Blade (2018) - Saizo
Kingdom (2019) - Saji
Rise of the Machine Girls (2019) - Matsukata
Crazy Samurai Musashi (2020) – Miyamoto Musashi
Osaka girl (2020) - Toshiro Kuroda
Tokyo dragon hanten (2020)
Ninja Jaja-maru-kun (2020)
Koi-no-haka (2020)
Boryoku Muso (2021)
Prisoners of the Ghostland (2021)
1%er: One-Percenter (2022)
 Bad City (2023) - Han

Director 
Sakigake!! Otokojuku (2008)
Yoroi: Samurai Zombie (2008)
Mutant Girls Squad (First segment) (2010)
Yakuza Weapon (2011)

Writer 
Sakigake!! Otokojuku (2008) (screenplay)

Fight choreographer 
Godzilla: Final Wars (2004)
Death Trance (2006)
Akihabara@DEEP (2006)
Sakigake!! Otokojuku (2008)
Ai no Mukidashi (2009)
Yakuza girl (2010)
Cold fish (2010)
Himizu (2012)
Kurocorch (2013)
Tokyo tribe (2014)
Torakage (2015)
Iron grandmother (2015)
Real Oni gokko (2015)
HiGH&LOW THE RED RAIN （2016)
Blue hearts ga kikoeru (2017)
Tokyo vampire hotel (2017)
Sekai ha kyo-kara kimi no mono (2017)
Kodoku meat ball machine (2016)
Final life (2017)
Demekin (2017)
Kuso yaro to Utsukushiki sekai [pianist o utsuna] (2018)
Iron grandmother 2 (2018)
Genin akai kage (2019)
Genin Aoi kage (2019)

TV drama 
Be-Bop High School Series (2005-2005) – Toshimitsu Yamada (fight director)
Koi wa jikka ja Umarenai (2005)
Satomi Hakkenden (2006)  - Suketomo Ota
Kamen Rider Kabuto (2006) – Reiji Nogi/Cassis Worm
Kagero no tuji (2007)
Otome no Punch (2008)
Yukemuri Sniper (2009)
Crover (2012) - Hiroki Mido
Bouncer (2017) - Seijiro Torai
7nin no hisho (2020) - Kuroda
Red eyes (2021) - Mayumi

Notes

See also 
Hideo Sakaki

References 
 Midnight Interview with Ryuhei Kitamura

External links 

 

Japanese male actors
1975 births
Living people
People from Ishikawa Prefecture
Action choreographers
Japanese choreographers
Japanese film directors
Japanese stunt performers